Dorota Urbaniak (born 6 May 1972 in Łask, Poland) is a Canadian rower.

References 
 
 

1972 births
Living people
Canadian female rowers
People from Łask
Rowers at the 2000 Summer Olympics
Olympic bronze medalists for Canada
Olympic rowers of Canada
Polish emigrants to Canada
Olympic medalists in rowing

World Rowing Championships medalists for Canada
Medalists at the 2000 Summer Olympics